The 1915 Clemson Tigers football team represented Clemson Agricultural College—now known as Clemson University—as a member of the Southern Intercollegiate Athletic Association (SIAA) during the 1915 college football season. Under fifth-year head coach Bob Williams, the team compiled an overall record of 2–4–2 record with a mark of 2–2–1 in SIAA play. W. K. McGill was the team captain. Riggs Field was introduced as Clemson's new home stadium in 1915. Riggs hosted the football team until Memorial Stadium was built in 1942.

Schedule

References

Bibliography
 

Clemson
Clemson Tigers football seasons
Clemson Tigers football